Events in the year 2020 in the Republic of the Congo.

Incumbents
 President: Denis Sassou Nguesso

Events
March 14 – First confirmed case of COVID-19 in the Republic of the Congo
 August 25 – Mobanza Mobembo Gerard, nicknamed "the butcher of Nouabale Ndoki", was sentenced to 30 years in prison for ivory trafficking and attempted murder of park rangers.

Deaths

6 January – Aloïse Moudileno Massengo, politician and lawyer, Vice President (b. 1933).
19 March – Aurlus Mabélé, singer and composer (b. 1953).
28 March – Jean-Claude Ganga, sports administrator (b. 1934).
30 March – Joachim Yhombi-Opango, politician, President and Prime Minister (b. 1939).
8 April – François Luc Macosso, politician (b. 1938).
23 June – Jean-Michel Bokamba-Yangouma, trade unionist and politician.
24 August – Pascal Lissouba, 88, Congolese politician, President (1992–1997) and Prime Minister (1963–1966), complications from Alzheimer's disease.
23 December – King Makosso IV, 76, King of Loango (since 2009).

See also
COVID-19 pandemic in the Republic of the Congo
2020 in Middle Africa

References

 
2020s in the Republic of the Congo
Years of the 21st century in the Republic of the Congo
Congo
Congo